Diana Angwech is a Ugandan lawyer and has served as the vice president of the Uganda Law Society since September 2020.

Education 
Angwech obtained a Bachelor of Laws from Makerere University.

Career 
Angwech began her legal career at ROK advocates. She later served as an attorney for the International Justice Mission for over five years, and she currently works as the business development manager at Shonubi Musoke & Co. Advocates.

In September 2020, Diana Angwech was elected vice president of the Uganda Law Society (ULS) replacing Phoena Wall, who was elected as president of the ULS. She also serves as chairperson of the Young Lawyers Committee under the Executive Council of the ULS as well as the Young Lawyers committee under the East Africa Law Society.

Angwech is the founder and chairperson of the Alabaster Mentorship Program. She is chairperson of Abide Family Centre a non-governmental organization geared towards promoting the health of families located in Jinja, Uganda.

References 

21st-century Ugandan lawyers

Year of birth missing (living people)
Living people
Makerere University alumni
Ugandan women